The Lincoln Potters are an independent collegiate wood bat baseball team based in Lincoln, California.  They are operating as part of the summer collegiate wood bat league known as the California Collegiate League.  It began operations in 2016 as members of the Great West League.  They play their home games at McBean Stadium in Lincoln.  The Potters replaced the Lodi Crushers and Sacramento Stealth, who went inactive for 2017.

History
The Potters were named for the former minor league baseball franchise that played in the Placer-Nevada Baseball League and that was founded by newspaper editor Allen "Scoop" Thurman of the Colfax Record back in 1923.  They won PNL championships in 1926, 1941, 1950, 1951, 1952, 1954, 1956 and 1957 and played until 1968.  They played under several different name such as Cubs, Tigers, Merchants, and eventually the Potters.  They had sponsorship from Gladding McBean, a terra cotta and clay manufacturing company located in Lincoln that replaced much of the friezes and other ornamental decorative pieces that were destroyed in the 1906 San Francisco earthquake. The sewer pipe and roofing tile manufacturer was founded in 1875 and still operates today as one of California's oldest companies.  

On October 4, 2018, the Potters announced that they were departing the Great West League to play in the California Collegiate League for 2019 and beyond after the GWL announced that they were ceasing operations.

Year-by-year record

Great West & CA Collegiate Leagues

References

External links
 Lincoln Potters official website
 Great West League official website

Placer County, California
Amateur baseball teams in California
Baseball teams established in 2016
2016 establishments in California